UnderSurface is the sixth book by American author Mitch Cullin with illustrations by Peter I. Chang.  It was first published in September 2002 as a hardback edition from The Permanent Press.

2002 American novels
Novels by Mitch Cullin

Native American novels
Permanent Press (publisher) books